Microlipophrys bauchotae is a species of combtooth blenny found in the eastern Atlantic ocean, known only from the Bay of Victoria, Cameroon and Bahia de Isabel, Bioko. This species grows to a length of  TL.

Etymology
The specific name honours the French ichthyologist and assistant manager at the Muséum national d'histoire naturelle in Paris Marie-Louise Bauchot who had realised that this was a new species in 1967 but who felt there was too little material to describe a new species.

References

bauchotae
Fish of Cameroon
Fish of Equatorial Guinea
Fauna of Bioko
Marine fauna of Central Africa
Taxa named by Peter Wirtz
Taxa named by Hans Bath
Fish described in 1982